Stigmella plumosetaeella is a moth of the family Nepticulidae. It is found in Arizona and Tamaulipas in Mexico.

External links
Taxonomic checklist of Nepticulidae of Mexico, with the description of three new species from the Pacific Coast (Insecta, Lepidoptera)

Nepticulidae
Moths described in 1982
Moths of North America